Military Madness: Nectaris is a turn-based strategy game developed for WiiWare, Xbox Live Arcade and PlayStation Network by Hudson Soft. It is the latest game in the Nectaris series, and an enhanced remake of the first game.

Nectaris has the maps as the original, but features 3D graphics, new units, a new story and online co-op and competitive multiplayer modes for up to four players. Hudson claimed that all three versions are identical, save for a few multiplayer maps omitted in the WiiWare version.

The WiiWare version was discontinued in March 2012. The PlayStation Network version was delisted in Europe in 2017.

Reception

The game received "mixed or average reviews" on all platforms according to the review aggregation website Metacritic.

References

External links
 

2009 video games
Computer wargames
Hudson Soft games
Multiplayer and single-player video games
PlayStation 3 games
PlayStation Network games
Strategy video games
Turn-based tactics video games
Video games developed in the United States
Wii games
WiiWare games
Xbox 360 Live Arcade games